Jed Anderson (born 2 February 1994) is an Australian rules footballer who plays for the Gold Coast Suns in the Australian Football League (AFL).

Early life

Anderson was born in Katherine, Northern Territory into a family of Indigenous Australian descent (Warramungu) and moved to Darwin at the age of 12. His grandfather, Jim Anderson, is a member of the Northern Territory Team of the Century and an NTFL Hall of Fame inductee. Jed grew up playing junior football for the Darwin Buffaloes and played in the 2011 NEAFL premiership for the NT Thunder.

AFL career

Greater Western Sydney (2010)

Anderson was picked for the  scholarship program in 2010. When he was 16, he moved to western Sydney to spend a season playing for GWS's TAC Cup team, while being educated at Saint Ignatius' College, Riverview. He struggled to settle into his new school, got homesick and returned home mid-year. He was selected in the 2011 All-Australian under-18 team after an outstanding NAB AFL Under-18s championships.

Hawthorn (2013–15)
Anderson was pre-listed by Greater Western Sydney and traded to Hawthorn for 2008 premiership player Stephen Gilham. Anderson made his debut for the Hawks in round 1 of the 2013 AFL season against Geelong. He was the round 3 AFL Rising Star nominee for 2013 following his performance against  in which he kicked his first goal. After an injury layoff, he played for Hawthorn's VFL-affiliate, Box Hill, until his form saw his return to the Hawthorn line-up in round 22. He played as the substitute and kicked a vital goal against  in both round 23 and the qualifying final. He was one of the better players in the Box Hill premiership team in the 2013 Grand Final.

Anderson had a delayed start to 2014 pre-season after contracting pneumonia while on end of season leave in Darwin. He had been wading at Howard Swamps, southeast of Darwin, in search of geese. He resumed training with the club in January. In the first game of the VFL season against Williamstown, Anderson hurt his shoulder that eventually was operated on and he was out for the rest of the season.

Anderson who was contracted until the end of 2016 requested a trade for a chance to move to another club and get more opportunities for regular senior football. The small forward managed only four games for the 2015 season .

North Melbourne (2016–22)

On 16 October 2015,  brokered a deal for the Roos to receive Anderson and picks No.38 and 40 while  got picks No.15 and 55. After Round 1 in the 2016 AFL season, Anderson injured his hamstring but was able to play the last 9 games of 2016.

Injuries continued to hammer Anderson's progress in the AFL, but as he has got older he has managed to spring large sequences of games together. In 2018 he managed to play 21 games in the season.

In 2020, Anderson placed third in North’s Best and Fairest vote, the Syd Barker Medal.

After 89 games across seven seasons for the club, Anderson was advised in October 2022 that he wouldn’t be offered a contract by the club for 2023.

Gold Coast (2023–)

In December 2022, Anderson was listed by the Gold Coast Suns as a supplementary selection period (SSP) signing.

Statistics
Updated to the end of the 2022 season.

|-
| 2013 ||  || 37
| 6 || 3 || 3 || 35 || 22 || 57 || 11 || 15 || 0.5 || 0.5 || 5.8 || 3.7 || 9.5 || 1.8 || 2.5 || 0
|-
| 2014 ||  || 37
| 0 || — || — || — || — || — || — || — || — || — || — || — || — || — || — || 0
|-
| 2015 ||  || 37
| 4 || 1 || 3 || 18 || 22 || 40 || 4 || 20 || 0.3 || 0.8 || 4.5 || 5.5 || 10.0 || 1.0 || 5.0 || 0
|-
| 2016 ||  || 3
| 10 || 2 || 4 || 60 || 47 || 107 || 21 || 32 || 0.2 || 0.4 || 6.0 || 4.7 || 10.7 || 2.1 || 3.2 || 0
|-
| 2017 ||  || 3
| 5 || 3 || 2 || 28 || 28 || 56 || 8 || 24 || 0.6 || 0.4 || 5.6 || 5.6 || 11.2 || 1.6 || 4.8 || 0
|-
| 2018 ||  || 3
| 21 || 7 || 8 || 188 || 225 || 413 || 46 || 109 || 0.3 || 0.4 || 9.0 || 10.7 || 19.7 || 2.2 || 5.2 || 0
|-
| 2019 ||  || 3
| 17 || 6 || 3 || 146 || 204 || 350 || 44 || 93 || 0.4 || 0.2 || 8.6 || 12.0 || 20.6 || 2.6 || 5.5 || 0
|-
| 2020 ||  || 3
| 15 || 3 || 4 || 177 || 138 || 315 || 41 || 75 || 0.2 || 0.3 || 11.8 || 9.2 || 21.0 || 2.7 || 5.0 || 3
|-
| 2021 ||  || 3
| 7 || 4 || 1 || 65 || 67 || 132 || 22 || 40 || 0.6 || 0.1 || 9.3 || 9.6 || 18.9 || 3.1 || 5.7 || 0
|-
| 2022 ||  || 3
| 14 || 3 || 3 || 156 || 152 || 308 || 56 || 38 || 0.2 || 0.2 || 11.1 || 10.9 || 22.0 || 4.0 || 4.1 || 0
|- class="sortbottom"
! colspan=3| Career
! 99 !! 32 !! 31 !! 873 !! 905 !! 1778 !! 253 !! 466 !! 0.3 !! 0.3 !! 8.8 !! 9.1 !! 18.0 !! 2.6 !! 4.7 !! 3
|}

Notes

Honours and achievements
Team
 Minor premiership: 2013
 VFL premiership player: 2013
 Minor premiership: 2015

Individual
 AFL Rising Star nominee: 2013
 Indigenous All-Stars team: 2013
 Under 18 All-Australian team: 2011

Family
Jed's older brother Joe Anderson played 17 games for Carlton between 2007 and 2010.
 
Anderson's first child, his son Elijah, was born in Darwin in April 2013.
A second son, Jasiah was born in January 2015.

References
 http://www.nmfc.com.au/news/2016-10-04/2016-review-jed-anderson

External links

1994 births
Hawthorn Football Club players
Living people
Australian rules footballers from the Northern Territory
Indigenous Australian players of Australian rules football
Northern Territory Football Club players
Box Hill Football Club players
Sportsmen from the Northern Territory
North Melbourne Football Club players
Werribee Football Club players